Bruno Gomes may refer to:

 Bruno Gomes (footballer, born 1996), Bruno Gomes de Oliveira Conceição, Brazilian football forward
 Bruno Gomes (footballer, born 2001), Bruno Gomes da Silva Clevelário, Brazilian football midfielder